Pieter De Somer (22 December 1917 – 17 June 1985) was a Belgian physician and biologist. He studied medicine from 1935 up to 1942 at the Catholic University of Leuven (Leuven, Belgium). He did research and later became a professor at the Department of medicine, where he specialised in microbiology and immunology. In 1968, he became the first rector of the Flemish Katholieke Universiteit Leuven and he remained rector until his death in 1985.

Pieter De Somer founded both the company Recherche et Industrie Thérapeutiques and the Rega Institute for Medical Research.

External links
 Rega Institute for Medical Research

1917 births
1985 deaths
Flemish scientists
20th-century Belgian businesspeople
Belgian immunologists
Catholic University of Leuven (1834–1968) alumni
Academic staff of KU Leuven